Landsdale is an electoral district of the Legislative Assembly in the Australian state of Western Australia.

Geography
Landsdale is located in Perth's northern suburbs. It is bounded to the west by the Wanneroo Road, to the south by the Hepburn Avenue and Marangaroo Drive, to the east by Alexander Drive. Its northernmost boundary is Elliot Road in Hocking. The districts includes the suburbs of Landsdale, Darch, Madeley, Alexander Heights, Wangara, Pearsall and Hocking.

History
The district was created for the 2021 state election, essentially as a new name for the district of Girrawheen. It is a notional fairly safe Labor seat.

Members for Landsdale

Election results

References

External links
 WAEC district maps: current boundaries, previous distributions

Electoral districts of Western Australia